Transitus Fluvii ("passing through the river" in Latin) or Passage Du Fleuve (in French) is an occult alphabet consisting of 22 characters described by Heinrich Cornelius Agrippa in his Third Book of Occult Philosophy (Cologne, 1533, but written around 1510). It is derived from the Hebrew alphabet and is similar to the Celestial and Malachim alphabets. The name may refer to the crossing of the Euphrates by the Jews on their return from Babylon to rebuild the Temple.

This alphabet can also be found in Abraham de Balmis Peculium Abrae. Grammatica hebraea una cum latino, Venetiis, 1523, sig. B6v.
as well as in Geoffroy Tory, Champ Fleury, Paris 1529, f. 76v ubi tamen: "Lettres Chaldaiques", and Giovanni Agostino Panteo's (Pantheus) Voarchadumia contra alchimiam, Venice, 1530, pp. 545–46. Pantheus claims that, while the Hebrew alphabet was entrusted to Moses and Enochian to Enoch, the Transitus Fluvii was entrusted to Abraham.

Appearances in popular culture 
The alphabet is depicted in the movie The Blair Witch Project. It is also referenced in the book An Enemy at Green Knowe, part of the Green Knowe series by British author Lucy Boston.

References

External links 
Heinrich Cornelius Agrippa's "De Occulta Philosophia" at Wikisource
Pantheus Voarchadumia contra alchimiam at Gallica
Passing the River alphabet at Omniglot
Agrippa, Occult Philosophy Book 3 at esotericarchives
Peculium Abrae at esotericarchives

Artificial scripts used in mysticism
Language and mysticism
Writing systems introduced in the 16th century